Illicium verum is a medium-sized evergreen tree native to northeast Vietnam and southwest China. A spice commonly called star anise, staranise, star anise seed, star aniseed, star of anise, Chinese star anise, or badian that closely resembles anise in flavor is obtained from the star-shaped pericarps of the fruit of I. verum which are harvested just before ripening. Star anise oil is a highly fragrant oil used in cooking, perfumery, soaps, toothpastes, mouthwashes, and skin creams. Until 2012, when they switched to using a bacterial source, Roche Pharmaceuticals used up to 90% of the world's annual star anise crop to produce shikimic acid, a chemical intermediate used in the synthesis of oseltamivir (Tamiflu).

Etymology and nomenclature

Illicium comes from the Latin  meaning "entice" or "seduce".

Verum means "true" or "genuine".

The name "badian" appears to derive, via French , from the apparently descriptive Chinese name for it, lit. "eight horns". However, a derivation from the Persian  , "fennel", exists, with the Oxford English Dictionary indicating that its origin before that is unknown.

Description
Leaves are aromatic, simple and lanceolate, obovate-elliptic or elliptic, size of 5–15 cm × 2–5 cm, coriaceous to thickly coriaceous. The leaves are 5–15 cm × 1.5–5 cm, apex acute, lower side pubescent. Flowers are solitary, bisexual, pink to dark red, axillary or subterminal. The perianth has lobes 7–12, arranged spirally; stamens number of 11–20, arranged spirally, with short, thick filaments; carpels usually 8, free, arranged in a single whorl. Flower peduncle size is 1.5–4 cm, tepals number range from seven to twelve, and are broadly elliptic to broadly ovate, anthers size is 1–1.5 mm, pollen grains trisyncolpate.

The fruit is a capsule-like follicetum, star-shaped, reddish-brown, consisting of six to eight follicles arranged in a whorl. Each follicle is boat-shaped, 1–2 cm long, rough and rigid, color reddish-brown, with 1 seed, opening along the ventral edge when ripe. carpels size of 10 mm long, boat-shaped; they are hard and wrinkled, containing one seed. Seeds are brown, compressed ovoid, smooth, shiny and brittle with approximate size of 8–9 mm × 6 mm.

Differences with similar taxa:
Illicium anisatum had smaller fruits that does not form a regular star due to the abortion of some carpels. Also fruit follicles are not swollen in the middle and had a more pointed apex. Also usually had more than 8 follicles and the fruit has weaker odour. The seeds in Illicium anisatum are flat or almost spherical.

Use

Culinary use

Star anise contains anethole, the same compound that gives the unrelated anise its flavor. Recently, star anise has come into use in the West as a less expensive substitute for anise in baking, as well as in liquor production, most distinctively in the production of the liqueur Galliano. Star anise enhances the flavour of meat.

It is used as a spice in preparation of biryani and masala chai all over the Indian subcontinent. It is widely used in Chinese cuisine, and in Malay and Indonesian cuisines. It is widely grown for commercial use in China, India, and most other countries in Asia. Star anise is an ingredient of the traditional five-spice powder of Chinese cooking. It is also a major ingredient in the making of phở, a Vietnamese noodle soup.

It is also used in the French recipe of mulled wine, called vin chaud (hot wine). If allowed to steep in coffee, it deepens and enriches the flavor. The pods can be used in this manner multiple times by the pot-full or cup, as the ease of extraction of the taste components increases with the permeation of hot water.

Drug precursor

Star anise is the major source of the chemical compound shikimic acid, a primary precursor in the pharmaceutical synthesis of the antiinfluenza drug oseltamivir (Tamiflu). An industrial method for the production of shikimic acid using fermentation of E. coli bacteria was discovered in 2005, and applied in the 2009 swine flu pandemic to address Tamiflu shortages, also causing price increases for star anise as a raw material of shikimic acid. As of 2018, fermentation of E. coli was the manufacturing process of choice to produce shikimic acid for synthesis of Tamiflu. Study shows star anise can be used as anti quorum sensing and anti-biofilm agent in food matrix.

Toxicity of related species

Illicium verum is not toxic. However, other related species are toxic.

Japanese star anise (Illicium anisatum), a similar tree, is highly toxic and inedible; in Japan, it has instead been burned as incense. Cases of illness, including "serious neurological effects, such as seizures", reported after using star anise tea may be a result of deliberate economically motivated adulteration with this species. Japanese star anise contains the neurotoxin anisatin, which also causes severe inflammation of the kidneys (nephritis), urinary tract, and digestive organs when ingested.

Swamp star anise Illicium parviflorum is a similar tree found in the Southern United States, and due to its toxicity, it should not be used for folk remedies or as a cooking ingredient.

Standardization of its products and services
 ISO 676:1995 – contains the information about the nomenclature of the variety and cultivars

Identification
 Refer to the 4th edition of the European Pharmacopoeia (1153)

Differentiation from other species
Joshi et al. have used fluorescent microscopy and gas chromatography to distinguish the species, while Lederer et al. employed thin layer chromatography with HPLC-MS/MS.

Specifications
 ISO 11178:1995 - a specification for its dried fruits

References

verum
Spices
Indian spices
Non-timber forest products
Medicinal plants of Asia
Trees of China
Trees of Vietnam
Taxa named by Joseph Dalton Hooker